Princess Ana Nugzaris asuli Bagration-Gruzinsky (born 1 November 1976) is a royal princess of the Gruzinsky branch of the Bagrationi dynasty of Georgia.

Early life and career
Princess Ana is the eldest child of the head of the Bagration-Gruzinsky family, Prince Nugzar Bagration-Gruzinsky, and his wife, Leila, scion of noble Kipiani family, and a former actress. Ana has one younger sister, Princess Maia Bagration-Gruzinsky, born on 2 January 1978.

Originally a journalist, Princess Ana more recently worked as a teacher in a Tbilisi school.

Princess Ana attended Tbilisi State University.

Marriages and children

First marriage
Princess Ana Bagration-Gruzinsky was firstly married civilly and religiously on 17 May 2001 to Grigoriy Malania (born in 1970). Malania, an architect, is the son of Grigoriy Malania (1947-2009) and Nana Mgaloblishvili (born in 1951). Through his mother, Grigoriy Malania is a descendant of the last king of Georgia, George XII. He was accorded the day of his religious marriage the courtesy title of Prince and the status of member of the royal house of Bagrationi by his then-father-in-law.

Princess Ana and Grigoriy Malania had two daughters, who, with the agreement of their father, bear the surname of their mother:
Princess Irine Bagration-Gruzinsky (born in 2003).
Princess Mariam Bagration-Gruzinsky (born in 2007).

The marriage of Princess Ana Bagration-Gruzinsky and Grigoriy Malania was dissolved by divorce in 2007.

Second and third marriages
In a lavish ceremony attended by over 3,000 guests, Princess Ana Bagration-Gruzinsky was secondly married on 8 February 2009 at the Holy Trinity Cathedral of Tbilisi to a distant cousin, Prince David Bagration of Mukhrani. On the wedding day, Princess Ana told Georgian television channel Rustavi 2 that "I hope that this (day) will be the happiest of my life." Her father, Prince Nugzar, was also quoted as saying, "The most important thing is that this day will be beneficial for Georgia's future."

The wedding received the blessing of Patriarch Ilia II of Georgia, who was very supportive of the joining of the Bagration-Gruzinsky and Bagration-Mukhransky lines. Reports also surfaced that the Patriarch hoped that any son born of the union of Princess Ana and Prince David would become the first post-Soviet tsar of Georgia. The marriage was also hailed by Georgian monarchists hoping for the establishment of a constitutional monarchy under the Bagrationi dynasty.

Princess Ana and Prince David separated within months of their nuptials. Allegations arose that members of the Georgian government conspired to thwart the patriarch's hopes by  encouraging Georgian model Shorena Begashvili to undermine the marriage by seducing Prince David, and she subsequently admitted having an affair with him. Their first marriage was dissolved in August 2009. The couple subsequently reconciled and contracted a civil marriage in Spain on 12 November 2010.

Princess Ana Bagration-Gruzinsky and Prince David Bagration-Mukhransky had one son:
Prince Giorgi Bagrationi (27 September 2011).

The second divorce of Princess Ana and Prince David took place on 15 December 2013. Princess Ana received custody of their son, Prince Giorgi.

Recent activities
Princess Ana has shown an interest in the socioeconomic issues affecting vulnerable segments of the Georgian population. Working with Heifer International and other local NGOs, she is seeking to ameliorate the living conditions of internally displaced persons, especially those affected by the Russo-Georgian War. The humanitarian efforts of Princess Ana have met with cooperation from members of the governments of Georgia and the Autonomous Republic of Abkhazia.

Honours and awards

Honours

Dynastic honours
  House of Bagrationi: 
 Grand Master Knight Grand Cross with Chain of the Royal Order of the Crown
 Knight Grand Collar of the Order of the Eagle of Georgia and the Seamless Tunic of Our Lord Jesus Christ

Foreign honour
  Rwandan Royal Family: Knight Grand Cross of the Royal Order of the Crown

Award
 : Grand Commander of the Social Order of the Amaranth

References

1976 births
Living people
Bagrationi dynasty of the Kingdom of Kartli-Kakheti
Ana Bagration-Gruzinsky
People from Tbilisi
Pretenders to the Georgian throne
Tbilisi State University alumni
Schoolteachers from Georgia (country)